The drag curve or drag polar is the relationship between the drag on an aircraft and other variables, such as lift, the coefficient of lift, angle-of-attack or speed. It may be described by an equation or displayed as a graph (sometimes called a "polar plot"). Drag may be expressed as actual drag or the coefficient of drag.

Drag curves are closely related to other curves which do not show drag, such as the power required/speed curve, or the sink rate/speed curve.

The drag curve

Like other such aerodynamic quantities, they are functions only of the angle of attack , the Reynolds number  and the Mach number .  and  can be plotted against , or can be plotted against each other.

If an aerodynamic surface is held at a fixed angle of attack in a wind tunnel, and the magnitude and direction of the resulting force are measured, they can be plotted using polar coordinates. When this measurement is repeated at different angles of attack the drag curve is obtained. Lift and drag data was gathered in this way in the 1880s by Otto Lilienthal and around 1910 by Gustav Eiffel, though not presented in terms of the more recent coefficients. Eiffel was the first to use the name "drag polar", however drag curves are rarely plotted today using polar coordinates.

Depending on the aircraft type, it may be necessary to plot drag curves at different Reynolds and Mach numbers. The design of a fighter will require drag curves for different Mach numbers, whereas gliders, which spend their time either flying slowly in thermals or rapidly between them, may require curves at different Reynolds numbers but are unaffected by compressibility effects. During the evolution of the design the drag curve will be refined. A particular aircraft may have different curves even at the same  and  values, depending for example on whether undercarriage and flaps are deployed.

The accompanying diagram shows  against  for a typical light aircraft. The minimum  point is at the left-most point on the plot. One component of drag is induced drag (an inevitable side-effect of producing lift, which can be reduced by increasing the indicated airspeed). In total, then

Power required curves
One example of the way the curve is used in the design process is the calculation of the power required curve, which plots the power needed for steady, level flight over the operating speed range. In level flight, lift equals weight  and thrust equals drag, so

 and

.

The extra factor of /η, with η the propeller efficiency, in the second equation enters because = (required thrust)×/η. Power rather than thrust is appropriate for a propeller driven aircraft, since it is roughly independent of speed; jet engines produce constant thrust. Since the weight is constant, the first of these equations determines how  falls with increasing speed. The low speed region shows a fall in lift induced drag, through a minimum followed by an increase in profile drag at higher speeds. The minimum power required, at a speed of 195 km/h  (121 mph) is about 86 kW (115 hp); 135 kW (181 hp) is required for a maximum speed of 300 km/h (186 mph). Flight at the power minimum will provide maximum endurance; the speed for greatest range is where the tangent to the power curve passes through the origin, about 240 km/h (150 mph).)

If an analytical expression for the curve is available, useful relationships can be developed by differentiation. For example the form above, simplified slightly by putting  = 0, has a maximum  at  = . For a propeller aircraft this is the maximum endurance condition and gives a speed of 185 km/h (115 mph). The effects of the approximation  = 0 are less than 5%; of course, with a finite  = 0.1, the analytic and graphical methods give the same results.

The low speed region of flight is known as the "back of the power curve" (sometimes "back of the drag curve") where more power is required in order to fly slower. It is an inefficient region of flight because speed can be increased and power decreased; there is no trade-off between increased speed and increased power consumption. It is regarded as a "speed unstable" region of flight, because a decrease in speed will lead to a further increase in speed if power if not adjusted, unlike in normal circumstances.

Rate of climb
For an aircraft to climb at an angle θ and at speed  its engine must be developing more power  in excess of power required  to balance the drag experienced at that speed in level flight and shown on the power required plot. In level flight  =  but in the climb there is the additional weight component to include, that is

 =  + .sin θ =  + .

Hence the climb rate .sin θ = .

Fuel efficiency

For propeller aircraft (including turboprops), maximum range and therefore maximum fuel efficiency is achieved by flying at the speed for maximum lift-to-drag ratio. This is the speed which covers the greatest distance for a given amount of fuel. Maximum endurance (time in the air) is achieved at a lower speed, when drag is minimised. 

For jet aircraft, maximum endurance occurs when the lift-to-drag ratio is maximised. Maximum range occurs at a higher speed. This is because jet engines are thrust-producing, not power-producing. Turboprop aircraft do produce some thrust through the turbine exhaust gases, however most of their output is as power through the propeller.

"Long-range cruise" speed (LRC) is typically chosen to give 1% less fuel efficiency than maximum range speed, because this results in a 3-5% increase in speed. However, fuel is not the only marginal cost in airline operations, so the speed for most economical operation (ECON) is chosen based on the cost index (CI), which is the ratio of time cost to fuel cost.

Gliders

Without power, a gliding aircraft has only gravity to propel it. At a glide angle of θ, the weight has two components,  at right angles to the flight line and  parallel to it. These are balanced by the force and lift components respectively, so

 and

.

Dividing one equation by the other shows that the glide angle is given by tan θ = /. The performance characteristics of most interest in unpowered flight are the speed across the ground,  say, and the sink speed ; these are displayed by plotting .sin θ =  against .cos θ = .

One way of finding solutions to the two force equations is to square them both then add together; this shows the possible ,  values lie on a circle of radius  / . When this is plotted on the drag polar, the intersection of the two curves locates the solution and its θ value read off.

The example polar here shows the gliding performance of the aircraft analysed above, assuming its drag polar is not much altered by the stationary propeller. A straight line from the origin to some point on the curve has a gradient equal to the glide angle at that speed, so the corresponding tangent shows the best glide angle  ≃ 3.3°. This is not the lowest rate of sink but provides the greatest range, requiring a speed of 240 km/h (149 mph); the minimum sink rate of about 3.5 m/s is at 180 km/h (112 mph), speeds seen in the previous, powered plots.

Sink rate

A graph showing the sink rate of an aircraft (typically a glider) against its airspeed is known as a polar curve. Polar curves are used to compute the glider's minimum sink speed, best lift over drag (L/D), and speed to fly.

The polar curve of a glider is derived from theoretical calculations, or by measuring the rate of sink at various airspeeds.  These data points are then connected by a line to form the curve. Each type of glider has a unique polar curve, and individual gliders vary somewhat depending on the smoothness of the wing, control surface drag, or the presence of bugs, dirt, and rain on the wing.  Different glider configurations will have different polar curves, for example, solo versus dual flight, with and without water ballast, different flap settings, or with and without wing-tip extensions.  

Knowing the best speed to fly is important in exploiting the performance of a glider. Two of the key measures of a glider’s performance are its minimum sink rate and its best glide ratio, also known as the best "glide angle". These occur at different speeds. Knowing these speeds is important for efficient cross-country flying. In still air the polar curve shows that flying at the minimum sink speed enables the pilot to stay airborne for as long as possible and to climb as quickly as possible, but at this speed the glider will not travel as far as if it flew at the speed for the best glide.

Effect of wind, lift/sink and weight on best glide speed
The best speed to fly in a head wind is determined from the graph by shifting the origin to the right along the horizontal axis by the speed of the headwind, and drawing a new tangent line.  This new airspeed will be faster as the headwind increases, but will result in the greatest distance covered.  A general rule of thumb is to add half the headwind component to the best L/D for the maximum distance.  For a tailwind, the origin is shifted to the left by the speed of the tailwind, and drawing a new tangent line.  The tailwind speed to fly will lie between minimum sink and best L/D. 

In subsiding air, the polar curve is shifted lower according the airmass sink rate, and a new tangent line drawn.  This will show the need to fly faster in subsiding air, which gives the subsiding air less time to lower the glider's altitude.  Correspondingly, the polar curve is displaced upwards according to the lift rate, and a new tangent line drawn.

Increased weight does not affect the maximum range of a gliding aircraft. Glide angle is only determined by the lift/drag ratio. Increased weight will require an increased airspeed to maintain the optimum glide angle, so a heavier gliding aircraft will have reduced endurance, because it is descending along the optimum glide path at a faster rate.

See also
Drag coefficient
Lift coefficient
Angle of attack
Lift (force)
Lifting-line theory

External links
 Glider Performance Airspeeds An animated explanation of the basic polar curve, with modifications for sinking or rising air and for head- or tailwinds.

References

Aerodynamics
Aircraft performance
Airspeed
Drag (physics)
Gliding technology

de:Polardiagramm (Strömungslehre)